Sam Roger Broomhall (born 29 July 1976) is a former New Zealand rugby union player. A loose forward, Broomhall represented Canterbury at a provincial level and the Crusaders in Super Rugby. He was a member of the New Zealand national side, the All Blacks, in 2002 and played in four international matches. He played for French side Clermont Auvergne from 2005 to 2008.

References

1976 births
Living people
Rugby union players from Christchurch
Canterbury rugby union players
Crusaders (rugby union) players
New Zealand rugby union players
New Zealand international rugby union players
ASM Clermont Auvergne players
Expatriate rugby union players in France
New Zealand expatriate sportspeople in France
New Zealand expatriate rugby union players